A Hegman gauge, sometimes referred to as a grind gauge, grind gage, or grindometer, is an instrument which indicates the fineness of grind or the presence of coarse particles and agglomeration in a dispersion. It is commonly used to determine how finely ground the particles of pigment (or other solid) dispersed in a sample of paint (or other liquid) are. This is important because many types of solid materials must be ground into finer particles in order to be dispersed in liquids. The resulting properties of the dispersion vary based on the size of individual particles and the degree which they are dispersed.

The Hegman gauge usually consists of a stainless steel block with a series of very small parallel grooves machined into it.  The grooves decrease in depth from one end of the block to the other, according to a scale stamped next to them.  A typical Hegman gauge is 170mm by 65mm by 15mm, with a channel of grooves running lengthwise, 12.5mm across and narrowing uniformly in depth from 100 μm to zero and used to determine particle size.

Use with paint
A Hegman gauge is used by placing a sample of paint at the deep end of the gauge and drawing the paint down with a flat edge along the grooves.  Grind gages are sold with machined flat 'drawdown bars' specifically for this purpose. The paint fills the grooves, and the location where a regular, significant "pepperyness" in the appearance of the coating appears, marks the coarsest-ground dispersed particles. This is the point where oversized particles start to appear in high density and determines the rating for that material. The reading is taken from the scale marked next to the grooves, in dimensionless "Hegman units" (or National Standard units; NS) and/or mils or micrometres.  Hegman units are defined in terms of an inverted size scale as shown below:

A lesser-used scale, North (or PCU), is also occasionally employed in the paint industry. Like the Hegman scale, this is also inverted compared to the value in microns:

Determining the fineness of a paint's grind is important, because too coarse a grind may reduce the paint's color uniformity, gloss, and opacity.  The Hegman gauge is widely used for this purpose because it requires minimal skill and only a few seconds' work.

Other uses
Grind gauges are used in a variety of fields, including; food, pharmaceutical, plastic and many others. In all of these fields, grind gauges are utilized to produce, store, and apply dispersion products.

Sizes
Hegman gauges are commonly available in the following ranges: 0 to 100 micrometres, 0 to 50 micrometres, 0 to 25 micrometres, 0 to 15 micrometres, and 0 to 10 micrometres.

References

Bibliography

Paints
Dimensional instruments
Laboratory equipment